Parham Town (commonly known as Parham) is a coastal town and port located in and capital of Saint Peter Parish on the island of Antigua, in Antigua and Barbuda. It had a population of 1,491 in 2001.

Geography
Parham is on the shore of Parham Harbour, a well-protected anchorage.

It has a population of 1,276 (2001 census).

It is the oldest town in the country (established in 1632) and was once the capital of British Antigua and Barbuda.

Demographics 
Parham has five enumeration districts.

 50700 Parham-LoversLane 
 50800 Parham-Market 
 50900 Parham-ByamsWharf 
 51001 Parham-School_1 
 51002 Parham-School_2

Census Data (2011)

Attractions
Parham Hill, a well-preserved colonial home.
Great Bird Island, in Parham Harbor
St. Peter's Anglican Church was built in 1840 by eminent English architect Thomas Weekes.

Law Enforcement
In January 2021, the Parham Police were moved to a temporary headquarters in the ticket booth in the Sir Vivian Richards Stadium, until a new police station can be constructed, with the old one being demolished.

See also

References 

Populated places in Antigua and Barbuda
Populated places established in 1632
1630s establishments in the Caribbean
1632 establishments in North America
1632 establishments in the British Empire
Saint Peter Parish, Antigua and Barbuda